Vladislav Ivanov Goranov (born 30 April 1977) is a Bulgarian economist and politician, who served as  Minister of Finance of the Republic of Bulgaria until late July 2020. In February 2023 Goranov was sanctioned by the US government for his extensive involvement in corruption in Bulgaria.

Biography

Vladislav Goranov was born on 30 April 1977 in Pleven. He was a deputy finance minister in Boyko Borissov’s first government and a member of Parliament in the 42nd National Assembly and Minister of Finance (2014 – 2017) in Boyko Borissov‘s second government. Since 4 May 2017, he has again been a Minister of Finance of the Republic of Bulgaria in the government of political party Citizens for European Development of Bulgaria and the party of the United Patriots (from the former party’s quote). 
Goranov studied in the School of Mathematics “Geo Milev” in Pleven. In the period between 1994 and 1999 he graduated in economics from the Economic academy “Dimitar Apostolov Tsenov” in the city of Svishtov. His master's degree is in accountancy and control. Following this, he commenced his career in the government. He also possesses a doctoral degree from the University of National and World Economy, department “Human Resources and Social Protection”.

He is married, with two children.

Professional experience

From 1998 until 2001, he was a specialist in “Out-of-budget accounts and funds”, expert and director of department “Financial policy” at the Ministry of agriculture, forestry and agricultural reform. In 2001 he occupied the position of a chief expert in department “Financing of state bodies, programmes and security funds” at the Ministry of Finance. From 2001 until 2009, he was a head of unit “Social expenses” at the Ministry of Finance, department “Management of the public finances”.

As of August 2009 until April 2013, he occupied the position of a deputy minister of finances. He was a member of Parliament in the 42nd National Assembly which he left voluntarily in February 2014. Subsequently, he was appointed as an executive director and member of the board of directors of Municipal Bank.
 
Between November 2014 and January 2017, he was a minister of finance of the Republic of Bulgaria. After a short absence, in May 2017, he was appointed again as a minister of finance. 
In his ministerial capacity, he is also a member of the board of governors at the European Investment Bank as of 17 May 2017. During the first Bulgarian Presidency of the Council of EU in the first half of 2018, Goranov was the first Bulgarian Finance minister to preside the Economic and Financial Council (Ecofin).

See also
 :bg:Владислав Горанов Bulgarian Wikipedia article

References

1977 births
GERB politicians
Finance ministers of Bulgaria
Government ministers of Bulgaria
Living people
People from Pleven